Creeping snowberry is a common name for several plants and may refer to:
 Gaultheria hispidula
 Symphoricarpos hesperius
 Symphoricarpos mollis

References
Creeping snowberry at Integrated Taxonomic Information System